The National Liberation Day of Korea is a holiday celebrated annually on 15 August in both South  and North Korea. It commemorates Victory over Japan Day, when the United States and the Soviet Union liberated Korea from 35 years of Japanese rule.

Etymology
In South Korea it is known as Gwangbokjeol, and is one of the public holidays in South Korea. In North Korea it is known as Chogukhaebangŭi nal, and is also one of the public holidays in North Korea.

The name Gwangbokjeol is composed from the Korean words 광 (gwang), meaning “light”; 복 (bok), meaning “restoration”; and 절 (jeol), meaning “holiday”. The word “restoration” is used rather than the word for “independence”, 독립 (dongnip), in order to illustrate how Korea had been a nation for centuries prior to Japanese rule.

History

The day marks the annual anniversary of the announcement that Japan would unconditionally surrender on August 15, 1945. All forces of the Imperial Japanese Army were ordered to surrender to the Allies.

Independent Korean governments were created three years later, on 15 August 1948, when the pro-U.S. Syngman Rhee was elected first President of South Korea and pro-Soviet Kim Il-sung was made first Leader of North Korea. Gwangbokjeol was officially designated a public holiday on 1 October 1949 in South Korea and is known as Chogukhaebangŭi nal (literally "Liberation of Fatherland Day") in North Korea.

Korea has been an independent nation for centuries, but it had been invaded multiple times, the last being the period of Japanese rule. It took three years after Korea became independent in 1945 for the nation to actually establish the Republic of Korea on August 15th, when National Liberation Day is celebrated.

August 15th is celebrated by many countries as Victory Over Japan Day, the day Japan's emperor announced the country's surrender. The United States, however, commemorates this day in September when the Japanese formally signed a declaration of surrender.

North Korea

North Korea currently celebrates this holiday separately from South Korea. Nevertheless, Liberation Day is the only Korean holiday that is celebrated by both countries. In North Korea, it is typical to schedule weddings on the holiday.

On 5 August 2015, the North Korean government decided to return to UTC+08:30, effective 15 August 2015, and said the official name would be Pyongyang Time (or PYT). The government of North Korea made this decision as a break from 'imperialism'; the time zone change went into effect on the 70th anniversary of the liberation of Korea. North Korea reversed the change in May 2018.

The holiday is often celebrated with a military parade on Kim Il-sung Square on jubilee years (ex: 25th, 40th, 50th, 60th, 70th anniversaries) with the attendance of the Chairman of the State Affairs Commission and Commander-in-Chief of the Armed Forces of North Korea. The first parade was held in 1949 at Pyongyang Station. It was held again in 1953, and then conducted every year until 1960, when it took a pause until the early 2000s.

South Korea

Public holiday
In South Korea, many activities and events take place on the holiday, including an official ceremony attended by the President of the Republic either at the Independence Hall of Korea in Cheonan or at the  Sejong Center for the Performing Arts. During the celebration, the flags of different countries around the world hung in the middle of the road around the Jamsil area of Seoul between the Olympic Stadium and Olympic Park are taken down and replaced with Korean national flags.

All buildings and homes are encouraged to display the South Korean national flag Taegukgi. Not only are most public museums and places open free of charge to the descendants of independence activists on the holiday, but they can also travel on both public transport and intercity trains for free.

The official "Gwangbokjeol song" (광복절 노래) is sung at official ceremonies. The song's lyrics were written by Jeong Inbo (정인보) and the melody by Yoon Yongha (윤용하). The lyrics speak of "to touch the earth again" and how "the sea dances", how "this day is the remaining trace of 40 years of passionate blood solidified" and to "guard this forever and ever".

The government traditionally issues special pardons on Gwangbokjeol.

Assassination attempt

At 10:23 a.m., 15 August 1974, Mun Se-gwang, a Zainichi Korean and North Korean sympathizer, attempted to assassinate President Park Chung-hee at the National Theater of Korea in Seoul during a Gwangbokjeol ceremony; Park was unharmed but his wife Yuk Young-soo, First Lady of South Korea, was killed.

In popular culture
 The Peak aka Life of Lee Youk-sa, the Poet who Embraced Epoch, starring Kim Dong-wan of boyband Shinhwa is a two-part special drama broadcast on MBC to commemorate Gwangbokjeol. It is on the life of poet and independence activist, Lee Youk-sa, who lived during the Japanese colonial period, and died in prison at 40 leaving behind some 40 pieces of poetry.
 The third drama rendition of Park Gyeong-ni's epic novel Toji (literally "The Land"), is a 52-episode historical drama which aired from 27 November 2004 to 22 May 2005, was broadcast by South Korean broadcaster SBS as commemoration of the 60th anniversary of Gwangbokjeol; and the only drama rendition after all 21 volumes were completed.
 The ability to pardon prisoners on this day was the theme for a comedy film that was released in 2002, called 광복절특사, where the main characters escape from prison, only to find out that they are going to be pardoned the next day on 광복절.

See also
 Independence Hall of Korea in Cheonan
 Seodaemun Prison in Seoul

References

Further reading
South Korea Independence Day at Holidays around the World

External links

 The Independence Hall of Korea
 Gwangbokjeol Song, video clip made in 1958 at the Ministry of Public Administration and Security's official blog 
Gwangbokjeol Song at the Ministry of Patriots and Veterans Affairs 

1945 in Korea
August observances
Korean independence movement
Public holidays in North Korea
Public holidays in South Korea
Victory days
Summer events in South Korea
Summer events in North Korea